Bolivia is scheduled to compete at the 2023 Pan American Games in Santiago, Chile from October 20 to November 5, 2023. This will be Bolivia's 19th appearance at the Pan American Games, having competed at every edition of the Games.

Competitors
The following is the list of number of competitors (per gender) participating at the games per sport/discipline.

Cycling

BMX
Bolivia qualified three cyclists (two men and one woman) in BMX race through the UCI World Rankings.

Racing

Equestrian

Bolivia qualified one equestrian in Jumping at the 2022 South American Games.

Jumping

Karate

Bolivia qualified 1 female karateka at the 2022 South American Games.

Kumite

Modern pentathlon

Bolivia qualified four modern pentathletes (two men and two women).

Shooting

Bolivia qualified a total of three shooters in the 2022 Americas Shooting Championships.

Men
Pistol and rifle

Men
Shotgun

Women
Pistol and rifle

References

Nations at the 2023 Pan American Games
2023